These are the films shown at the 6th New York Underground Film Festival, held from March 10–14, 1999

See also
 New York Underground Film Festival site
 1999 Festival Archive

New York Underground Film Festival
Underground Film Festival
1999 film festivals
1999 in American cinema
1999 festivals in the United States